Trębna  (590 m a.s.l.) is a peak in Krzeszowskie Wzgórza.

Position 
Trębna is located on the south-eastern slope of the Krzeszowskie Wzgórza, above Grzędy Górne. It has many small valley and ridges. Southern slope features a local road connecting Kochanów to Grzędy and Czarny Bór.

The geological structure 
It is made of Permian porphyry conglomerates.

Vegetation 
On the top and the eastern slope a forest grows, but most of the slopes are occupied by disused agricultural land.

Bibliography 
 Słownik Geografii Turystycznaj Sudetów, tom 8, Kotlina Kamiennogórska, Wzgórza Bramy Lubawskiej, Zawory pod red. M. Straffy, Wydawnictwo I-BiS, Wrocław 1997, 83-85773-23-1, s. 315

Mountain peaks of the Krzeszowskie Wzgórza